Puerto Rico Highway 870 (PR-870) is a road located entirely in the municipality of Toa Baja, Puerto Rico.

Major intersections

See also

 List of highways numbered 870

References

870
Toa Baja, Puerto Rico